Dominique Leroy (born 8 November 1964, Ixelles) is a Belgian businesswoman who has been serving as member of the board of Deutsche Telekom since 2020. She was previously the CEO of telecommunications company Proximus Group from 2014 until 2019.

Education
Leroy obtained a master's degree in business economics from Solvay Business School in 1987.

Career
After having held different positions at Hartog and Union Belgium, Leroy worked for 24 years at Unilever. She was the national customer development director of Unilever Belgium from February 2006 until August 2007. Before joining Belgacom, she was Director of Unilever Belgium from September 2007 until October 2011. 

From June 2012, Leroy served as executive vice president of the consumer business unit and was a member of the management committee of Belgacom. The ministers of the Belgian Cabinet appointed Leroy as successor to Didier Bellens on 9 January 2014. She became the first woman to head the company and, at the time, the only female CEO among companies in Belgium’s BEL 20 stock market index.

By late 2018, the Financial Times reported that Leroy was one of the candidates for succeeding Gavin Patterson as CEO of the BT Group; the job instead went to Philip Jansen. In early 2019, she was summoned to meet Belgian Prime Minister Charles Michel after media reported a cost-cutting plan at Proximus that would involve a net headcount reduction of 650 jobs.

Thursday September 5, 2019 she announced her resignation as CEO of Proximus effective December 1, 2019 to become CEO of Dutch telecom provider KPN. On September 30, 2019 KPN announced that Leroy was no longer a candidate for the position of CEO, since she was under investigation by the Belgian Financial Services and Markets Authority for insider trading.

Other activities

Corporate boards
 Saint-Gobain, Independent Member of the Board of Directors (since 2017)
 Ahold Delhaize, Member of the Board of Directors (since 2016)
 Belgacom ICS, Chairwoman of the Board of Directors (since 2014)
 Lotus Bakeries, Member of the Board of Directors (2009-2018)

Non-profit organizations
 European Round Table of Industrialists (ERT), Member
 Solvay Brussels School of Economics and Management, Member of the International Advisory Board

References

External links

Linkedin page Dominique Leroy
news article announcing Dominique Leroy as new CEO of Belgacom

Living people
1964 births
Belgian business executives